was the sixteenth single by the Japanese band The Blue Hearts and reached #80 on the Oricon charts in 1993. It was part of the band's seventh album, Dug Out, and was the worst selling single that was released by a major label for the band. The music and lyrics were written by Hiroto Kōmoto.

Details
In addition to the original versions of "Party" and the B-side track "Chance" (チャンス Chansu), karaoke versions of both songs were also included on the CD. "Chance" was written by Masatoshi Mashima.

References

1993 singles
The Blue Hearts songs
Songs written by Hiroto Kōmoto
Songs about parties
1993 songs